Dúber Alexander Zapata Carrillo (born 2 November 1976 in Zorritos) is a Peruvian retired footballer who played primarily as a full back. He last played for Alianza Unicachi.

Club career
Zapata started his career with Copa Perú side International Marine Incorporated. He was part of the squad that won title in the 1998 Copa Perú season. As a result his club was promoted to the Torneo Descentralizado for the 1999 season. However his side finished in last place and were relegated.

Zapata returned to the Descentralizado in 2001 playing for Chiclayo giants Juan Aurich. He played there until the 2002 season

References

1976 births
Living people
People from Tumbes Region
Association football fullbacks
Peruvian footballers
Peruvian Primera División players
Club Alcides Vigo footballers
Juan Aurich footballers
Club Deportivo Wanka footballers
Sport Boys footballers
Alianza Atlético footballers
Club Deportivo Universidad César Vallejo footballers
Ayacucho FC footballers
Unión Comercio footballers